The 1943 Brooklyn Dodgers season was their 14th season in the league and their final season before becoming the Brooklyn Tigers. The team failed to improve on their previous season's output of 3–8, winning only two games. They failed to qualify for the playoffs for the 12th consecutive season and were shut out in their first four games.

Schedule

Standings

References

Brooklyn Dodgers (NFL) seasons
Brooklyn Dodgers (NFL)
Brooklyn
1940s in Brooklyn
Flatbush, Brooklyn